Harvington railway station was a station in Harvington, Worcestershire, England. The station was opened on 17 September 1866, train services were withdrawn in 1962 and a bus service provided until officially closed on 17 June 1963.

References

Further reading

Disused railway stations in Worcestershire
Railway stations in Great Britain opened in 1866
Railway stations in Great Britain closed in 1963
Former Midland Railway stations